Quealy or Quealey is a surname in the English language. It is derived from one of several names in Irish: Ó Cadhla  and Ua Caollaidhe of Uí Bercháin (Ibercon) in Osraige.

Notable people with the surname
Chelsea Quealey (1905–1950), American jazz trumpeter
Gerit Quealy (born 1960), American writer, editor, Shakespearean scholar and actor
Jim Quealey (1917–?), Australian professional rugby league footballer
Michael Quealy (fl. 1980s), former Fine Gael politician in Ireland
Patrick Quealy (1857–1930), founder of Kemmerer, Wyoming
William H. Quealy (1913–1993), judge of the United States Tax Court

See also
Queally

References

English-language surnames